Sören von Malmborg is a Swedish mixing and mastering engineer. He has worked with artists and songwriters such as Avicii, Alan Walker, Kygo, NONONO, Seeb, Vargas & Lagola, Tove Lo, A$AP Rocky, Noonie Bao, and Dagny. 

Von Malmborg worked with Alan Walker on his multi-platinum selling hit single "Faded", which currently has over one billion streams on Spotify and more than 2.3 billion views on YouTube.

Discography

Mixing and mastering credits

Albums

Songs

References

Year of birth missing (living people)
Living people
Swedish audio engineers